Ormsby Brunson Thomas (August 21, 1832October 24, 1904) was an American lawyer, Republican politician, and Wisconsin pioneer.  He was a member of the United States House of Representatives for three terms (1885–1891), representing Wisconsin's 7th congressional district.  He also served five years in the Wisconsin Legislature and 13 years as district attorney of Crawford County, Wisconsin.

Early life and career
Ormsby Thomas was born in Sandgate, Vermont, but moved to the Wisconsin Territory with his parents when he was a young child.  His parents settled in Prairie du Chien, in Crawford County.  After receiving his early education, he was sent to the Burr Seminary in Manchester, Vermont, for an academic education.  He then graduated from the State and National Law School in Poughkeepsie, New York, in 1856.  He was admitted to the bar in Albany, New York, that year.  He returned to Prairie du Chien to establish his own law practice.

He became active in local politics and was elected district attorney of Crawford County in 1858, running on the Democratic Party ticket.  He was subsequently re-elected in 1860.

Civil War service
When the American Civil War started, in 1861, Thomas was the incumbent district attorney in Crawford County and was running for Wisconsin State Assembly.  He was elected to represent Crawford County in the 1862 session of the Wisconsin Legislature.

After the end of the 1862 legislative session, Thomas went to work raising a company of volunteers for the Union Army from Crawford County.  His company was enrolled as Company D in the 31st Wisconsin Infantry Regiment, and Thomas was formally commissioned captain in September 1862.  For the first several months of their service, the regiment was solely tasked with training for battle, supervising conscription of draftees, and guarding Confederate prisoners of war at camps in Wisconsin.  The regiment was reorganized at Racine, Wisconsin, in the Winter of 1862–1863, and mustered into federal service.

They were sent to the western theater of the war and assigned to protecting supplies and logistics in Middle Tennessee through all of 1863.  Thomas resigned his commission in January 1864 and returned to Wisconsin.

Postbellum years

On returning to Wisconsin, Thomas was elected to another term in the Assembly, but was now running on the National Union Party ticket.  This was a short-term alliance of Republicans and Pro-Union Democrats.  Thomas served in the Union caucus in the 1865 session of the Legislature and remained associated with the Republican Party for the rest of his life.  He was not a candidate for re-election in 1865, but was elected to another term in the Assembly in 1866.

After the legislative session in 1867, Governor Lucius Fairchild appointed Thomas to fill the vacant district attorney post in Crawford County, following the resignation of Joseph M. Wilcox.  He served the remainder of Wilcox's term and was then elected to another term in 1868.

In 1869, he ran for Wisconsin State Senate in the 30th State Senate district, but was defeated by Democrat George Krouskop.  He subsequently was elected to another term as district attorney in 1870.  In 1872, he was a presidential elector for Ulysses S. Grant.

During the 1870s, Thomas was focused on his legal practice.  He formed a partnership with Charles S. Fuller in 1876, which became a prominent and leading practice throughout the state.  Fuller was later appointed a county judge in the 1880s.

Thomas resumed his political career in 1879, running for Wisconsin State Senate in the 4th State Senate district, which comprised Crawford County following the 1876 redistricting law.  Thomas was easily elected running on the Republican ticket; he received 56% of the vote in a three-person race.

Congressional career

Thomas did not run for re-election in 1881, and in 1882, he waged a campaign for nomination to Congress, from Wisconsin's 7th congressional district.  His principal opponent was believed to be Gideon Hixon, who had the support of delegates from La Crosse County, but after 29 ballots at the Republican 7th district convention, the delegates broke in favor of Cyrus M. Butt, of Viroqua.  Butt went on to lose the general election to Democrat Gilbert M. Woodward.

Two years later, Thomas made another run for congress.  This time, he won the nomination on the first ballot at the convention.  He went on to defeat Woodward in the general election with 52% of the vote.  He was subsequently re-elected in 1886 and 1888, serving in the Forty-ninth, Fiftieth, and Fifty-first congresses.  During the 51st Congress, Thomas was chairman of the House Committee on War Claims.  He was defeated seeking a fourth term in 1890, in the wave election that saw Democrats claim 8 of Wisconsin's 9 congressional seats.

After leaving office, he resumed his legal career with his old partner, Judge C. S. Fuller.  Fuller, however, committed suicide in 1897.  In 1898, Thomas accepted the Republican nomination for another term as district attorney of Crawford County, and was elected in the Fall.

During his final term as district attorney, Thomas suffered from Bright's disease.  His health continued to deteriorate after he left office in January 1903.  He died at his home in Prairie du Chien on October 24, 1904.  At the time of his death, he was described as the oldest member of the State Bar of Wisconsin.

Personal life and family
Ormsby B. Thomas married Sarah E. Rosencrans at Prairie du Chien in June 1875.  They had three children together before her death in 1884.  Their first child, however, died in infancy.

Electoral history

Wisconsin Senate (1869)

| colspan="6" style="text-align:center;background-color: #e9e9e9;"| General Election, November 2, 1869

Wisconsin Senate (1879)

| colspan="6" style="text-align:center;background-color: #e9e9e9;"| General Election, November 4, 1879

U.S. House of Representatives (1884–1890)

References

External links
 
 Thomas, Ormsby Brunson 1832 - 1904 at Wisconsin Historical Society
 

1832 births
1904 deaths
People from Sandgate, Vermont
People from Prairie du Chien, Wisconsin
State and National Law School alumni
Union Army officers
People of Wisconsin in the American Civil War
Wisconsin lawyers
District attorneys in Wisconsin
Republican Party members of the Wisconsin State Assembly
Republican Party Wisconsin state senators
Republican Party members of the United States House of Representatives from Wisconsin
19th-century American politicians